An inclined plane is a physical structure which uses a difference in height to gain a mechanical advantage.

Inclined plane may also refer to:

Canal inclined plane, application of the method to a canal interchange
 Inclined plane railroad, funicular, or cable railway
 Design feature applied on some fixed-wing aircraft 
 ‘’Schiefe Ebene’’, specific stretch of German railway with a severe gradient (in Upper Franconia, aka ’’Oberfranken’’)